Sumava Resorts is an unincorporated community in Lake Township, Newton County, in the U.S. state of Indiana.

History
Sumava Resorts was laid out in 1926. A post office has been in operation at the community since 1928. A group of Czech immigrants from Chicago formed the Sumava Forest Resorts Inc..  It was named for the Bohemian Forest, which in the Czech Republic is called the Šumava Forest.

The resort became a weekend and summer resort for the Chicago Community.  Special trains would bring the city folks out to Sumava and return each weekend. Lukes' Restaurant & Tavern on County Road N 250 W became the center of activities dining on duck, roast chicken, dumplings and kraut.

The communities location along the Kankakee River meant that it has been plaqued by flooding.  Three major floods occurred in 1950, 1967, and 1976.  A levee break in 1993 brought national attention to the community.  The U.S. Army Corps of Engineers designed and constructed a $7 million dike around the community, ending the annual risk of flooding.

Geography
Sumava Resorts is located at

References

Unincorporated communities in Newton County, Indiana
Unincorporated communities in Indiana